Scutellaria tuberosa is a species of flowering plant in the mint family known by the common name Danny's skullcap. It is native to western North America from Oregon through California to Baja California, where it is widespread throughout the mountain and coastal regions; it is absent from the deserts and the Central Valley of California. It can be found in forest and woodland habitat, and a variety of open habitat types, often appearing in areas recently cleared by wildfire. It is a perennial herb producing an erect stem or cluster of stems up to about 25 centimeters tall from a root system with tubers. The stems are coated in short, spreading hairs. The oval leaves are oppositely arranged. The lowest leaves are borne on short petioles. Flowers emerge from the leaf axils. Each flower is held in a calyx of sepals with a large ridge or dome-shaped appendage on the upper part. The tubular corolla is one to two centimeters long and has a large upper and lower lip. The upper lip is folded into a beaklike protrusion and the lower has three wide lobes. The corolla is deep purple-blue, usually with a white patch or mottling on the lower lip.

References

External links

Calflora Database: Scutellaria tuberosa (Danny's skullcap)
Jepson Manual eFlora (TJM2) treatment of Scutellaria tuberosa
USDA Plants Profile
UC CalPhotos gallery of Scutellaria tuberosa

tuberosa
Flora of California
Flora of Baja California
Flora of Oregon
Flora of the Klamath Mountains
Flora of the Sierra Nevada (United States)
Natural history of the California chaparral and woodlands
Natural history of the California Coast Ranges
Natural history of the Peninsular Ranges
Natural history of the Transverse Ranges
Taxa named by George Bentham
Flora without expected TNC conservation status